The 1873 Liverpool by-election was held on 7 February 1873 after the death of the incumbent Conservative MP, Samuel Robert Graves.  It was retained by the Conservative candidate John Torr.

References

1873 elections in the United Kingdom
Liverpoool, 1873
1873 in England
1870s in Liverpool